Marvin K. Mooney Will You Please Go Now! is a 1972 children's book by Dr. Seuss. Written as a book for early beginning readers, it is suitable for children who can not yet read at the level of more advanced beginning books such as The Cat in the Hat. The book presents, in short and funny fashion, Dr. Seuss's nonsensical words, rhymes, and illustrations. In the book, Marvin K. Mooney (an anthropomorphic dog wearing a purple pajamas jumpsuit) is asked to "go" (by an individual in said book); "go" with many ways. The narrator is an unseen individual. Their voice is heard, but they are not seen (except for their left arm and hand). 

In the first page, the narrator starts, "The time has come! The time is now! JUST GO, GO, GO! I DON'T CARE HOW!". The narrator then suggests various ways for Marvin to go (even though he does not mind how). But still, he tells Marvin the same thing, "Marvin K. Mooney, will you please go now?!". 

For the final way (final suggestion) to go, the narrator (who is the individual) says to Marvin for the final time that he does not mind how but still wants him to leave the room (which Marvin in seen riding some sort of a flight transportation; which pulls a total of seven ducks), "Marvin K. Mooney, I don't care HOW! Marvin K. Mooney, will you please go now?!".

Finally, in the end, on one of the last two pages, the individual says to Marvin, "I said, 'GO'! And 'GO', I meant!" (the two matching words "GO" and "GO" on that last page are shown in capital and extremely big letters). The narrator concludes the line (at the final page), "The time had come. So, Marvin WENT!".

In political culture
At the height of the Watergate scandal, in a July 1974 collaboration with political humorist Art Buchwald, Dr. Seuss took a two-year-old copy of his book, crossed out "Marvin K. Mooney" wherever it occurred and wrote in "Richard M. Nixon". With Dr. Seuss's consent, Buchwald and his editors reprinted the markup as a newspaper column, published on July 30. U.S. President Nixon resigned ten days later on August 9.

In Maureen Dowd's column for The New York Times, "Wilting over Waffles", dated April 23, 2008, she suggests that Democrats in the 2008 presidential election might take a cue from this book in their approach to Hillary Clinton's prolonged campaign against Barack Obama, asking her to "just go. I don't care how". MEP Daniel Hannan quoted the book in reference to Gordon Brown after the 2009 European Parliament election.

The same idea has also been applied to Hosni Mubarak during the 2011 Egyptian Revolution and Donald Trump during and after both the 2016 United States presidential election and the 2020 United States presidential election.

References

1972 children's books
American picture books
Books by Dr. Seuss
Watergate scandal
Cultural depictions of Richard Nixon
Random House books
Books about dogs